Naroor  is a village in Phagwara Tehsil in Kapurthala district of Punjab State, India. The village is administrated by a Sarpanch who is an elected representative of village as per the constitution of India and Panchayati raj (India).

Transport 
There is no railway station near to Naroor village in less than 10 km. However Jalandhar City Railway  Station is major railway station 27 km near to the village.  The village is 119 km away from Sri Guru Ram Dass Jee International Airport in Amritsar and the another nearest airport is Sahnewal Airport  in Ludhiana which is located 52 km away from the village.  The cities of Phagwara, Jandiala, Jalandhar, and Hoshiarpur are near Naroor village.

References

External links
  Villages in Kapurthala
 Kapurthala Villages List

Villages in Kapurthala district